The , also known as the , was the feudal military government of Japan during the Muromachi period from 1336 to 1573.

The Ashikaga shogunate was established when Ashikaga Takauji was appointed Shōgun after overthrowing the Kenmu Restoration shortly after having overthrown the Kamakura shogunate in support of Emperor Go-Daigo. The Ashikaga clan governed Japan from the Imperial capital of Heian-kyō (Kyoto) as de facto military dictators along with the daimyō lords of the samurai class. The Ashikaga shogunate began the Nanboku-chō period between the Pro-Ashikaga Northern Court in Kyoto and the Pro-Go-Daigo Southern Court in Yoshino until the South conceded to the North in 1392. The Ashikaga shogunate collapsed upon outbreak of the Ōnin War in 1467, entering a state of constant civil war known as the Sengoku period, and was finally dissolved when Shōgun Ashikaga Yoshiaki was overthrown by Oda Nobunaga in 1573.

History

Beginning 
From 1180 to 1185, the Genpei War was fought between the Taira and Minamoto clans longstanding violent rivalry for influence over the Emperor of Japan and his Imperial Court. The Genpei War ended with victory for the Minamoto under Minamoto no Yoritomo, establishing the Kamakura shogunate after being pronounced Shōgun and beginning the Kamakura period. The Hōjō clan rose to power and governed Japan from the city of Kamakura, while the Emperor and his Imperial Court remained in the official capital city of Heian-kyō as largely symbolic figures. The Hōjō monopoly of power, as well as the lack of a reward of lands after the defeat of the Mongol invasions, led to simmering resentment among Hōjō vassals. In 1333, the Emperor Go-Daigo ordered local governing vassals to oppose Hōjō rule, in favor of Imperial rule in the Kenmu Restoration. The Kamakura shogunate ordered Ashikaga Takauji to squash the uprising, but for reasons that are unclear, Takauji turned against Kamakura and fought on behalf of the Imperial court, successfully overthrowing the shogunate. It is possibly because Takauji was the unofficial leader of the powerless Minamoto clan while the Hōjō clan were from the Taira clan the Minamoto had previously defeated. Japan was returned to Imperial civilian rule, but Emperor Go-Daigo's policies were unpopular and failed to satisfy those who had fought for him. In 1336, Takauji established his own military government in Kyoto, effectively overthrowing the Kenmu Restoration and appointing himself as the new Shōgun.

North and South Court 

After Ashikaga Takauji established himself as the Shōgun, a dispute arose with Emperor Go-Daigo on the subject of how to govern the country. That dispute led Takauji to cause Prince Yutahito, the second son of Emperor Go-Fushimi, to be installed as Emperor Kōmyō while Go-Daigō fled Kyoto. Japan was subsequently divided between two Imperial courts: the Northern Court located in Kyoto, in favor of Kōmyō under Ashikaga influence, and Southern Court located in Yoshino, in favor of Go-Daigō. The Northern and Southern courts engaged in an ideological struggle for power that continued for 56 years, until the Southern Court gave up during the reign of Shōgun Ashikaga Yoshimitsu in 1392.

Fall of the shogunate 
As the daimyō increasingly feuded among themselves in the pursuit of power in the Ōnin War, that loyalty grew increasingly strained, until it erupted into open warfare in the late Muromachi period, also known as the Sengoku period.

When the shōgun Ashikaga Yoshiteru was assassinated in 1565, an ambitious daimyō, Oda Nobunaga, seized the opportunity and installed Yoshiteru's brother Yoshiaki as the 15th Ashikaga shōgun. However, Yoshiaki was only a puppet of Nobunaga.

The Ashikaga shogunate was finally destroyed in 1573 when Nobunaga drove Ashikaga Yoshiaki out of Kyoto. Initially, Yoshiaki fled to Shikoku. Afterwards, he sought and received protection from the Mōri clan in western Japan. Later, Toyotomi Hideyoshi requested that Yoshiaki accept him as an adopted son and the 16th Ashikaga shōgun, but Yoshiaki refused.

The Ashikaga family survived the 16th century, and a branch of it became the daimyō family of the Kitsuregawa domain.

Government structure 

The Ashikaga shogunate was the weakest of the three Japanese military governments. Unlike its predecessor, the Kamakura shogunate, or its successor, the Tokugawa shogunate, when Ashikaga Takauji established his government he had little personal territory with which to support his rule. The Ashikaga shogunate was thus heavily reliant on the prestige and personal authority of its shōgun. The centralized master-vassal system used in the Kamakura system was replaced with the highly de-centralized daimyōs (local lord) system, and because of the lack of direct territories, the military power of the shōgun depended heavily on the loyalty of the daimyō.

On the other hand, the Imperial court was no longer a credible threat to military rule. The failure of the Kenmu Restoration had rendered the court weak and subservient, a situation that Ashikaga Takauji reinforced by establishing his court within close proximity of the Emperor at Kyoto. The authority of the local daimyō greatly expanded from its Kamakura times. In addition to military and policing responsibilities, the shogunate-appointed shugos now absorbed the justice, economical and taxation powers of the local Imperial governors, while the government holdings in each province were rapidly absorbed into the personal holdings of the daimyō or their vassals. The loss of both political clout and economic base deprived the Imperial court of much of its power, which were then assumed by the Ashikaga shōgun. This situation reached its peak under the rule of the third shōgun, Ashikaga Yoshimitsu.

After Yoshimitsu however, the structural weakness of the Ashikaga shogunate were exposed by numerous succession troubles and early deaths. This became dramatically more acute after the Ōnin War, after which the shogunate itself became reduced to little more than a local political force in Kyoto.

Foreign relations
The Ashikaga shogunate's foreign relations policy choices were played out in evolving contacts with Joseon on the Korean Peninsula and with imperial China.

Palace remains 

The shogunal residence, also known as the "Flower Palace", was in Kyoto on the block now bounded by Karasuma Street (to the east), Imadegawa Street (to the south), Muromachi Street (to the west, giving the name), and Kamidachiuri Street (to the north).

List of Ashikaga shōgun 
 Ashikaga Takauji, ruled 1338–1357
 Ashikaga Yoshiakira, r. 1359–1368
 Ashikaga Yoshimitsu, r. 1368–1394
 Ashikaga Yoshimochi, r. 1395–1423
 Ashikaga Yoshikazu, r. 1423–1425
 Responsibilities of government undertook by Ashikaga Yoshimochi, (1425–1428)
 Ashikaga Yoshinori, r. 1428–1441
 Ashikaga Yoshikatsu, r. 1442–1443
 Ashikaga Yoshimasa, r. 1449–1473
 Ashikaga Yoshihisa, r. 1474–1489
 Ashikaga Yoshitane, r. 1490–1493, 1508–1521
 Ashikaga Yoshizumi, r. 1494–1508
 Ashikaga Yoshiharu, r. 1521–1546
 Ashikaga Yoshiteru, r. 1546–1565
 Ashikaga Yoshihide, r. 1568
 Ashikaga Yoshiaki, r. 1568–1573

See also
 History of Japan
Kantō kubō
 Ashikaga clan
 Japanese missions to Imperial China
 Ōban (Great Watch)

Notes

References

Bibliography

External links
Ashikaga Bakufu from Washington State University website
Kyoto City Web

 
 
1330s establishments in Japan
1336 establishments in Asia
1573 disestablishments in Japan